The Leadville Trail 100 Run (aka The Race Across The Sky or the LT100) is an ultramarathon held annually on rugged trails and dirt roads near Leadville, Colorado, through the heart of the Rocky Mountains. First run in 1983, the race course climbs and descends , with elevations ranging from 9,200 to 12,620 feet (2,800–3,850 m). In most years, fewer than half the starters complete the race within the 30-hour time limit.

Course

History and records
In the early 1980s Colorado Ultra Club president Jim Butera had the idea of creating a 100 mile run in Colorado. When Aspen and Vail showed no interest Butera found support by Lake County Commissioner Ken Clouber to hold the event in Leadville as a way to bring in visitors after the closing of the Climax Molybdenum Mine. Butera designed the course and the first running was held on August 27–28, 1983, with Butera serving as race director with the assistance of Clouber and Merilee Maupin.

Leadville is one of the four 100-milers in the United States that make up the "Western Slam", completing four western  events:  the Leadville 100, the Western States 100 in northern California, the Wasatch Front 100 in Utah, and the Angeles Crest 100 in southern California.  Leadville is also a part of the Grand Slam of Ultrarunning (the Vermont 100, Western States 100, Leadville and the Wasatch Front 100, originally Old Dominion 100 instead of Vermont) and an optional part of the Rocky Mountain Slam (Hardrock 100 plus three of four other races in the Rocky Mountains: Leadville, the Bear 100, the Bighorn 100, or the Wasatch Front 100). Leadville is also one of the valid qualifying events for the Western States 100.

Leadville was the venue for the American debut of the Tarahumara runners of Mexico. In 1992 the Tarahumara first showed up to run outside their native environs. Wilderness guide Rick Fisher and ultra-runner Kitty Williams brought some of them to Leadville. However the experiment went bust. The problem, it turned out, was psychosocial, i.e. an unfamiliarity with the trail and the strange ways of the North. The Indians stood shyly at aid stations, waiting to be offered food. They held their flashlights pointed skyward, unaware that these "torches" needed to be aimed forward to illuminate the trail ahead. All five Tarahumara dropped out before the halfway point. The Tarahumara teams came back in 1993 and 1994 and won the Leadville event outright both years. In 1993, 52-year-old Tarahumara runner Victoriano Churro came in first, followed by 41-year-old teammate Cerrildo in second. In 1994, a five-man Tarahumara team took on Ann Trason  in a much-publicized race in the ultrarunning community. Twenty-five-year-old Tarahumara runner Juan Herrera won in a record time of 17:30. His mark stood for 8 years until broken by Chad Ricklefs in 2002 (17:23), then again by Paul DeWitt in 2004 and finally by current record holder Matt Carpenter's performance in 2005 (15:42). Trason finished in second place with a time of 18:06, which remains the course record for female runners.

Notable Finishers
The winner of the first race in 1983 was Skip Hamilton of Aspen, CO., in a time of 20:11:18

Matt Carpenter is the current course record holder.  His time of 15 hours and 42 minutes in 2005 shattered the previous Leadville Trail 100 record.  The publisher of Colorado Runner magazine, Derek Griffiths, said afterwards, “It was a perfect race for him.  He finished in daylight, for crying out loud — no one has ever done that before.  I think he has just raised the bar of ultra racing to a whole new level.”

Ann Trason holds the female LT100 record, 18:06:24, which she set in 1994. Trason is widely recognized as one of the greatest ultrarunners of all time, and nearly won the race outright in 1994.
Charles Williams holds the record of the oldest man to ever complete the race, which he did at the age of 70 in 1999.  He was featured in the August 1999 issue of GQ magazine, which compared his training for the race to that of a professional football player.

Bill Finkbeiner became the first person ever to receive the "Leadville 2000-Mile Buckle" for twenty LT100 finishes in 2003. Finkbeiner has a total of 30 consecutive finishes, starting in 1984. In 2014, Kirk Apt finished his 20th Leadville 100.  In 2019, Eric Pence finished his 25th Leadville 100, becoming the third person to earn 25 or more buckles, along with Finkbeiner and Garry Curry.

Results

Men's Winners

Women's Winners

Leadville Race Series
The LT100 is one of six races presented under the Leadville Trail 100 banner.  The other five events are as follows:

 Leadville 10K Run: This is an open event the week before the main Trail 100 race, comprising the first and last portions of the full Trail 100 course.
 Leadville Trail 100 MTB: This mountain bike race was added in 1994.  The race was the idea of Tony Post, then a marketing vice president at the Rockport Company, sponsor of the event who arranged for television coverage for both races. The first mountain bike race drew just 150 entrants, while the 2009 edition allowed 1400 entrants.  This USA Cycling-sanctioned race is held on a course that roughly parallels the LT100 run course, with some sections in common.  It is held the same weekend as the 10K, and has attracted cyclists including Dave Wiens, Lance Armstrong and Floyd Landis.  In 2010, Levi Leipheimer won the Leadville Trail 100 MTB in a then record time of 6:16:37, breaking the previous course record of 6:28:50 set in 2009 by Armstrong. The current course record is 5:58:35, set in 2015 by Alban Lakata. Howard Grotts, of Durango CO., has won the last three editions of the race, most notably in 2019 when a number of world tour road professionals competed in the race.
 Silver Rush 50 MTB: This race is a USAC-sanctioned  mountain bike race through the mining districts east of Leadville in late July.
 Silver Rush 50 Run: This is a 50-mile trail run introduced in 2008 that follows the same route as the MTB course.  The event occurs the day after the MTB event.  Competitors who complete both Silver Rush events are recognized with a Silver Queen or Silver King award.
 Leadville Trail Marathon: This is a  marathon through the mining districts east of Leadville, is held in June each year. In 2006, a "heavy" half marathon event of 15 miles was added, which is run on the same day and also goes to the top of Mosquito Pass.

A competitor who officially finishes the Trail 100 Run, Trail 100 MTB, the Marathon, the Silver Rush bike or run, and the 10K is called a "Leadman" or "Leadwoman", a title which nods to the Ironman Triathlon.  Charles Bybee currently holds the most Leadman titles, with 10 years of finishing all events (2007-2010, 2012–2017). In 2015, Junko Kazukawa completed the Grand Slam of Ultrarunning and the Leadwoman series, becoming the first person to complete both events in a single year. In 2019 Dion Leonard became the first male to complete the Grand Slam of Ultrarunning and the Leadman series in one year.

All events of the 2020 edition of the race series were cancelled due to the coronavirus pandemic, with all registrants given a deferral and a refund option for each race.

See also
 Leadville Trail 100 MTB

References

External links

 Leadville Race Series Trail 100 Run - Official website of the Leadville Trail 100 Mile
 Complete Results at UltraSignup
 CoolRunning.com.au - 1998 leadville  race finish:  The following is a short description of the incredible finish at the Leadville  trail race by Keith Woestehoff', Kevin Tiller
 SkyRunner.com - 'The Hammer:  Carpenter nails Leadville 100 – what's next?' David Ramsey, The Gazette
 VHTRC.org - 'Leadville Trail 100 Mile Run:  Leadville, Colorado, August 16–17, 2003', Mike Campbell, Virginia Happy Trails Running Club
 The Run Scout's Course Flyover & Review - 'Leadville Trail 100 Mile Run
 Riding Leadville - Training for the Leadville 100 Mountain Bike Race, Dirk Sorenson, 2011 "Last Ass Over The Pass" Winner
 

Recurring sporting events established in 1983
Ultramarathons in the United States
Foot races in Colorado
Tourist attractions in Lake County, Colorado
Trail running competitions